ICAT Design & Media College
 National Institute of Design
 Indian Institute Of Fashion And Design - (IIFD)
 Industrial Design Center
 National Institute of Fashion Technology
 Department of Design, IIT Hyderabad
 Department of Design, DA-IICT Gandhinagar
MAEER's MIT Institute of Design, Pune
 Srishti Institute of Art Design and Technology, Bangalore
 Kerala State Institute of Design, Kollam
 Strate School Of Design, Bangalore

Design